Elwyn Hartley Edwards, MC, was an equestrian writer and editor, born on 17 April 1927. He died on 9 December 2007, aged 80.

Elwyn Edwards was the editor of Riding magazine for 18 years. And the consultant editor for Horse & Hound for five years, he also served as a regional chairman of the British Horse Society and as a member of the BHS council, receiving the society's Award of Merit in 1993. He was also a vice-president of the Riding for the Disabled Association and vice-patron of the Horse and Pony Protection Association.

He used to regularly judge horse shows in the UK. He had written more than 30 books on horse-related subjects and was an authority on lorinery and saddlery.

Published works 
 The Encyclopedia of the Horse London: Dorling Kindersley 1994,

References 

The BHS pays tribute to legend Elwyn Hartley Edwards
Elwyn Hartley Edwards: Bestselling equestrian writer with a lucid and elegant prose style

External links
 Obituary in The Times, 31 December 2007
 Obituary in The Independent, 31 December 2007

British male equestrians
British male journalists
British writers
1927 births
2007 deaths